Petroleum Center is a populated place and ghost town in Cornplanter Township, Venango County, Pennsylvania, United States.  In the 19th century, the name was also spelled "Petroleum Centre".  The town today is almost deserted.

Geography
Petroleum Center is located at  (41.516, -79.682), at an elevation of 1,070 feet above sea level, along the banks of Oil Creek.  It is most easily found on local maps at the intersection of Petroleum Center Road and Russell Corners Road, within Oil Creek State Park, approximately five miles north-northeast  of Oil City.  Petroleum Center lies near the tracks of the Oil Creek and Titusville Railroad.

History

As the name implies, Petroleum Center was developed during the Pennsylvanian oil rush of the mid-19th century. The first well was drilled on the George Washington McClintock Farm in 1860.  Soon, a small community grew about half way between Oil City and Titusville. George Henry Bissell, James Bishop and others formed the Central Petroleum Company which owned the farm in the beginning of 1866, when daily production topped 1,000 barrels per day. By the summer of 1866, over 3,000 people called the Centre home with a bank, two churches, a theater, a half-dozen hotels/boarding houses, and stores serving all the needs of the growing community. Bissel & Co. Banking House stimulated economic growth with its direct ties to financial institutions in New York City.  President Ulysses S. Grant visited the town in 1871.  When a fire devastated the nearby town of Pithole, Pennsylvania, that town's newspaper, the Pithole Daily Record, was relocated to Petroleum Center.  The town was founded in 1866 and was essentially abandoned after 1873.

Notable person

The town is the birthplace of Congressman James F. Burke.

See also
 Oil Creek Railroad

References 
Anonymous. 1915. Honor Memory of the Discoverer of Petroleum. New York Times, August 29, 1915.
Giddens, Paul H.  "The Birth of the Oil Industry" (New York: Macmillan co., 1938).
Moore, W.B. & J.F. Sherretts. 2008. Oil Boom Architecture: Titusville, Pithole, and Petroleum Center, Pennsylvania (Images of America Series). Arcadia Publ. Mount Pleasant, SC. 128 pp. 
Wright, W. 1865. The Oil Regions of Pennsylvania: Showing Where Petroleum Is Found; How It Is Obtained, and at What Cost. With Hints for Whom It May Concern. Harper & Brothers, New York.

External links 
Oil Creek State Park Map
1872 Map of Venango County
United States Petroleum Company - Venango County, Pennsylvania - Incorporated in New York 1866

Ghost towns in Pennsylvania
Geography of Venango County, Pennsylvania
Populated places established in 1866
1866 establishments in Pennsylvania